Eclipse Island may refer to:

Eclipse Island (Western Australia), a barren island near Albany in Western Australia
Eclipse Island (Queensland), an island of the Great Palm Island group in Australia